Andres Põime (born 10 August 1957, in Tallinn) is an Estonian architect.

From 1964 to 1975 Andres Põime studied in the 2nd Secondary School of Tallinn (today's ). From 1975 he studied in the State Art Institute of the Estonian SSR (today's Estonian Academy of Arts) in the department of architecture. He graduated from the institute in 1980.

From 1980 to 1990 Andres Põime worked in the state design bureau Eesti Kommunaalprojekt (Estonian Communal Project). From 1991 to present Andres Põime has worked in the architectural bureau Studio-3 OÜ.

Most notable works by Andres Põime are the restaurant Kadriorg, apartment buildings in Nõmme and Kuressaare and the spa-hotel in Narva-Jõesuu. In addition to new projects Andres Põime has done numerous notable reconstruction projects – the old airport of Tallinn, the Russian Gymnasium etc. Andres Põime is a member of the Union of Estonian Architects.

Works
Kuressaare library, 2002 (with Tiit Kaljundi)
Restaurant Kadriorg, 2002
Reconstruction of the old airport of Tallinn, 2002
Reconstruction of the Lenderi Gymnasium, 2003
Hotel Barons, 2003
Single-family home in Pirita, 2003
Pirita Gymnasium, 2003
Single-family home in Haabneeme, 2003
Apartment building in Nõmme, 2004
Apartment building in Kuressaare, 2007
Reconstruction of the old army structures in Tondi, 2007

See also
List of Estonian architects

References
 
 Union of Estonian Architects, members
 Architectural Bureau Studio-3, works

1957 births
Living people
Architects from Tallinn
Estonian Academy of Arts alumni